Sankarlal Chakraborty (born 12 December 1975) is an Indian professional football manager and former player. He is current manager of I-League club Sudeva Delhi.

Playing career

Sankarlal Chakraborty is a Tata Football Academy graduate. He joined Mohun Bagan as a footballer in the year of 1996. He also played for East Bengal F.C. At his East Bengal career, he broke his leg while trying to tackle Chima Okorie during a Kolkata Derby in August 1997. He was a midfielder. His playing career ended in 2002–03 after getting injured heavily.

Coaching career

IFA Academy
He took to coaching at the academy of the Indian Football Association in 2012.

Mohun Bagan Athletic Club

He had been pursuing his coaching career at Mohun Bagan since 2014 as assistant coach before getting promoted to head coach. He worked under Subhash Bhowmick and Sanjoy Sen as an assistant coach. He got the opportunity to manage Mohun Bagan as a head coach during Calcutta Football League in 2017. He takes over as a head coach for Mohun Bagan in I-League in place of Sanjoy Sen in 2018.

Bhawanipore

Mohammedan Sporting 
He is the Technical Director of Mohammedan Sporting Club.

Sudeva Delhi 
On 14 December 2022, Sudeva Delhi officially unveiled Chakraborty as their new head coach. After end of the season, the club relegated from I-League.

Achievements

Player
East Bengal
IFA Shield: 2002

Manager
Mohun Bagan
Calcutta Football League (1): 2018–19

References

External links

1975 births
Living people
Indian football managers
I-League managers
Mohun Bagan AC managers
Mohammedan SC (Kolkata) managers
Footballers from Kolkata
Indian footballers
Mohun Bagan AC players
East Bengal Club players
Sudeva Delhi FC managers